The Chamber of Deputies was the lower house of Venezuela's legislative under its 1961 constitution; the Venezuelan Senate was the upper house. Under the 1999 constitution, the bicameral system was replaced by the unicameral National Assembly of Venezuela.

At the 1993 Venezuelan parliamentary election, the Chamber saw the introduction of a mixed member proportional representation system, modelled on the German system, with some variations. This replaced the previous "closed-list proportional representation system [which had] led to an extremely party-centered system." The traditionally dominant Democratic Action and COPEI "supported it because it looked the most like the system under which they had prospered".

"Seats for the Chamber of Deputies were allocated to each state on the basis of its population. Since 1970 a number of citizens equal to 0.55% of the population is entitled to a deputy, but since 1993 no state can have fewer than three deputies. A quota for additional seats in the Chamber of Deputies is calculated by dividing the total number of votes cast by the number of deputies determined by the size of the population. The number of votes received by each party nationally for deputies is divided by this result, and the difference between the seats already won and this final result is the number of additional seats awarded to the party. As in the Senate, there has always been a limit to the total number of additional seats any given party can receive. (Since 1980 no party has been allowed more than five additional seats in the Chamber of Deputies.)"

At the Chamber's last election in 1998, it had 207 members.

Presidents of the Chamber of Deputies

See also
 National Assembly (Venezuela), Unicameral legislature of Venezuela since 2000
 Senate of Venezuela, Upper house of Venezuela 1961–1999

References

Legislative branch of the Government of Venezuela
Defunct lower houses
1961 establishments in Venezuela
1999 disestablishments in Venezuela